Gensini score is a widely used means of quantifying angiographic atherosclerosis, where a zero score indicates absence of atherosclerotic disease.  The Gensini score accounts for the degree of artery narrowing as well as locations of narrowing.

References

Cardiovascular procedures
Medical diagnosis